Senator Linthicum may refer to:

Dennis Linthicum (born 1950s), Oregon State Senate
John Charles Linthicum (1867–1932), Maryland State Senate